Comanche is an unincorporated community in Yellowstone County, Montana, United States. It lies on Montana Highway 3, 16 miles northwest of the city of Billings and shares a postal ZIP code with Acton (59002). Comanche is at an elevation of 3,747 ft. (1142 m.); its coordinates are 45|59|51|N|108|46|24|W

History

Comanche was established as a railroad station on the Great Northern Railroad northwest of Billings. It was named for the famous horse that was the only living thing found on the battlefield after the Battle of the Little Big Horn as was the town's geographical region, Comanche Flat.

The village declined with the advent of changing transportation technologies and demographics. A Methodist Church and parsonage once existed in Comanche before being moved to nearby Broadview.

Comanche today has little left of its original structures. Some newer subdivisions, the original grain elevator, the depot, a hotel, the main street, and Comanche Cemetery west of town are all that remain. The post office was active in Comanche from 1909 to 1942 with Lola Dell Helm as postmaster.

References

Unincorporated communities in Yellowstone County, Montana
Unincorporated communities in Montana
Billings metropolitan area